Luka Božič (born 9 January 1991) is a Slovenian slalom canoeist who has competed at the international level since 2006.

He won seven medals at the ICF Canoe Slalom World Championships with two golds (C2: 2014, C1 team: 2022), a silver (C1 team: 2018) and four bronzes (C1: 2019, C2: 2009, C1 team: 2014, 2015). He also won three gold, two silver and three bronze medals at the European Championships.

At the 2012 Summer Olympics in London he competed in the C2 event where he finished in 8th place after being eliminated in the semi-final. Four years later in Rio de Janeiro he finished in 7th place in the same event.

His partner in the C2 boat was Sašo Taljat.

World Cup individual podiums

References

 – accessed 13 September 2009.

External links

Living people
Slovenian male canoeists
1991 births
Canoeists at the 2012 Summer Olympics
Canoeists at the 2016 Summer Olympics
Olympic canoeists of Slovenia
People from Šempeter pri Gorici
Medalists at the ICF Canoe Slalom World Championships